Spyridon is a Greek male given name. It is often shortened to Σπύρος (Spyros), often Anglicised as Spyridon, Spyro or Spiro.

Individuals bearing this name include:

Saint Spyridon, Orthodox/Catholic saint
Saint Spyridon Church, Romanian Orthodox church in Iași, Romania
St Spyridon College, Greek Orthodox school in Sydney
Archbishop Spyridon of Athens, former archbishop of Athens
Spiro Agnew, 39th vice president of the United States from 1969 to 1973, under President Richard Nixon
Spyridon Belokas (1877–unknown), Greek runner
Spyros Christopoulos, Greek footballer
Spyridon Gianniotis, freestyle swimmer
Spyros Gogolos, Greek footballer
Spyros Kokotos, Greek architect
Spyros Kyprianou, 2nd President of the Republic of Cyprus
Spyridon Lambros, Greek history professor and former Prime Minister of Greece
Spiros Livathinos, Greek footballer and football coach 
Spyridon Louis, gold medalist of the first modern Olympic Marathon
Spyridon Marinatos, 20th century archaeologist
Spyros Markezinis, Greek politician
Spyridon Mavrogenis, Phanariot (Ottoman) Greek doctor
Spyridon Merkouris, Greek politician, long-time mayor of Athens
Spyros Moustakas, Greek writer
Spyros Moustaklis, Greek democracy activist
Spyros Paliouras, Greek writer
Spiridon Putin, Lenin and Stalin's cook, grandfather of Vladimir Putin
Spiridione Roma, 18th-century Greek painter traveled to London
Spyros Spyromilios, Greek Gendarmerie officer in the Greek struggle for Macedonia
Spyridon Trikoupis, 2nd Prime Minister of Greece
Spyridon Samaras, Greek composer
Spyridon Stais, Greek politician
Spyridon Trikoupis, former Prime Minister of Greece
Spyros Vallas, Greek footballer
Spyridon Vasdekis, Greek long jumper
Spyridon Vassiliadis, Greek poet and playwright
Spyros Vrettos, Greek poet
Spyridon Xyndas, 19th century musician
Martinus Spyridon Johannes Lodewijk, Dutch comics writer and cartoonist, and advertising adviser.

See also
, a coaster
Spiridon (disambiguation)

Given names of Greek language origin
Greek masculine given names
Given names